The women's individual normal hill competition of the 2015 Winter Universiade was held at the Sporting Centre FIS Štrbské Pleso on January 27.

Results

References 

Women's Individual